The 1995–96 NBA season was the Bullets' 35th season in the National Basketball Association. In the 1995 NBA draft, the Bullets selected Rasheed Wallace from the University of North Carolina with the fourth overall pick. During the off-season, the team acquired All-Star guard Mark Price from the Cleveland Cavaliers, acquired Robert Pack from the Denver Nuggets, and signed free agents Tim Legler, Chris Whitney and former Bullets guard Ledell Eackles. However, injuries would be an issue as Chris Webber was limited to only just 15 games following the lingering effect to his injured left shoulder, averaging 23.7 points, 7.6 rebounds, 5.0 assists and 1.8 steals per game. Meanwhile, Price only appeared in just seven games due to a foot injury, and Pack, who only played just 31 games, was out with nerve damage in his right leg, averaging 18.1 points, 7.8 assists and 2.0 steals per game.

The Bullets played around .500 for the first half of the season, but struggled losing 11 of their 14 games in February, and held a 22–24 record at the All-Star break. After a 7-game winning streak, the Bullets lost their final four games and finished fourth in the Atlantic Division with a 39–43 record, which was an impressive 18-game improvement over their previous season. However, they missed the playoffs for the eighth consecutive season.

Second-year star Juwan Howard averaged 22.1 points, 8.1 rebounds and 4.4 assists per game, and was named to the All-NBA Third Team, and selected for the 1996 NBA All-Star Game, while 7' 7" center Gheorghe Mureșan averaged 14.6 points, 9.6 rebounds and 2.3 blocks per game, and was named Most Improved Player of the Year. In addition, Calbert Cheaney provided the team with 15.1 points per game, while Wallace averaged 10.1 points and 4.7 rebounds per game, and was named to the NBA All-Rookie Second Team, Price's younger brother, Brent Price, contributed 10.0 points and 5.1 assists per game, Legler contributed 9.4 points per game off the bench, and led the league with .522 three-point field goal percentage, Eackles provided with 8.6 points per game, and second-year center Jim McIlvaine contributed 2.1 blocks per game off the bench. Legler also won the Three-Point Shootout during the All-Star Weekend in San Antonio.

Following the season, Wallace and Mitchell Butler were both traded to the Portland Trail Blazers, while Pack signed as a free agent with the New Jersey Nets, Mark Price signed with the Golden State Warriors, while Brent Price signed with the Houston Rockets, McIlvaine signed with the Seattle SuperSonics, and Eackles was released to free agency.

Offseason

Draft picks

Roster

Regular season

Season standings

z – clinched division title
y – clinched division title
x – clinched playoff spot

Record vs. opponents

Game log

Player statistics

NOTE: Please write the players statistics in alphabetical order by last name.

Awards and records
 Gheorge Muresan, NBA Most Improved Player Award
 Juwan Howard, All-NBA Third Team
 Rasheed Wallace, NBA All-Rookie Team 2nd Team

Transactions

References

See also
 1995–96 NBA season

Washington Wizards seasons
Wash
Wiz
Wiz